Heartbreak High is an Australian drama created by Michael Jenkins and Ben Gannon, which follows the lives of students and staff at a multicultural Sydney high school.

The show ran from 1994 to 1996 on Network Ten and 1997 to 1999 on ABC, which some episodes airing on BBC2 in the UK ahead of their local release.

Series overview

Episodes

Series 1 (1994)
Heartbreak High premiered on Network Ten on 27 February 1994, and initially aired weekly at 6:30pm Sundays. The show's producers repeatedly clashed with the network over its content, with the gay-bashing storyline in episode 14 deemed inappropriate for its timeslot and prompting a scheduling change to 7:30pm Wednesdays. Episodes 37 and 38 were aired together as a two hour season finale on Sunday 27 November 1994 at 8:30pm.

Series 2 (1995)
For its second series, Heartbreak High was moved to a G-rated timeslot and aired weekly at 5:30pm Sundays. This led to episode 42 being pulled from its original run due to its HIV storyline,   deemed inappropriate for its new timeslot. The episode had its world premiere in the UK on BBC2 on Tuesday 3 October 1995 at 6:25pm, and eventually aired in Australia on Sunday 30 December 1995 at 7.30pm, after the third series had concluded.

Series 3 (1995)

Series 4 (1996)
After the show was cancelled by Network Ten, Heartbreak High was entirely funded by BBC2 for series four, who aired the show weekly at 6.25pm Tuesdays. Six months after its UK premiere, Network Ten aired the season in a soap opera format, with episodes split into two and airing across four nights (Mondays to Thursdays) at 11.30pm.

Series 5 (1996–97)
Series five premiered in the UK on BBC2 and aired weekly at 6.25pm Tuesdays. ABC picked up the show for its Australian release, and again split the episodes into two, airing them across four nights (Mondays to Thursdays) at 6pm.

Series 6 (1997–98)

Series 7 (1998–99)

Notes

References

External links
 
 Season 1 episodes at tvguide.com
 Season 2 episodes at tvguide.com
 Season 3 episodes at tvguide.com
 Season 4 episodes at tvguide.com
 Season 5 episodes at tvguide.com
 Season 6 episodes at tvguide.com
 Season 7 episodes at tvguide.com

Lists of Australian drama television series episodes